"Tears of Pearls" is a song by Savage Garden, released as the seventh and final single taken from their eponymous self-titled debut album. The song was later included on the remix disc of The Future of Earthly Delites, as the Tears on the Dancefloor Mix. There are two distinct versions of this mix; the original, and a version included on later pressings of the album, containing more reverb on the vocals.

Background
The single was available exclusively in selected areas of Europe. The music video for "Tears of Pearls" features tour footage from the group's Future of Earthly Delites tour. It was directed by Adolfo Doring. The music video features on the group's home video release, The Video Collection, and in edited form on the VHS release of The Story So Far.

The cover art for the single was also used for the 1998 re release of "I Want You" in the United Kingdom, and the release of "Santa Monica" as a single in Japan.

In the song's chorus, the pearls are revealed to be "mixed emotions" that humans keep locked away like stolen jewels, concealed from the rest of the world. From time to time those emotions and feelings burst out in the open, creating those tears of pearls.

In the words of Daniel Jones, "Tears of Pearls" was a track he composed "because Darren wanted me to write it". The creative process was unusual, consisting of Hayes requesting various changes from Jones to build up the song he had in mind. Darren Hayes described it as a "hipster-retroist" tribute to the New Wave acts of the 1980s, citing Duran Duran and George Michael as key inspirations. He clarified that "Tears of Pearls" was meant to be a "theatrical" number which he thought would be great to open Savage Garden's live shows and tours.

Track listing
CD single
 "Tears of Pearls" – 3:48
 "Love Can Move You" – 4:45

Maxi CD
 "Tears of Pearls" – 3:48
 "Santa Monica" (Live at the Hard Rock Cafe) – 3:41
 "Love Can Move You" – 4:45

Charts

Weekly charts

Year-end charts

References

1995 songs
1999 singles
Columbia Records singles
Savage Garden songs
Songs written by Daniel Jones (musician)
Songs written by Darren Hayes